The International scientific committee on price history was created in 1929 by William Beveridge and Edwin Francis Gay thanks to a five-years grant of the Rockefeller Foundation. The national representatives were William Beveridge for Great Britain, Moritz John Elsas for Germany, Edwin Francis Gay for the United States, Earl J. Hamilton for Spain, Henri Hauser for France and Alfred Francis Pribram for Austria; later came also Franciszek Bujak for Poland and Nicolaas Wilhelmus Posthumus for the Netherlands; Arthur H. Cole was in charge of finances for the whole project.

Books by the committee
 Hamilton (Earl J.), American Treasure and the Price Revolution in Spain (1501–1650), 1934.
 Hamilton (Earl J.), Money, Prices and Wages in Valencia, Aragon and Navarre (1351–1500), 1936.
 Hauser (Henri), Recherches et documents sur l’histoire des prix en France de 1500 à 1800, 1936.
 Elsas (Moritz John), Umriß einer Geschichte der Preise und Löhne in Deutschland vom ausgehenden Mittelalter bis zum Beginn des 19. Jarhunderts, 3 vol., 1936–1949.
 Přibram (Alfred Francis), Materialien zur Geschichte der Preise und Löhne in Österreich, 1938.
 Cole (Arthur Harrison), Wholesale Commodity Prices in the United States 1700–1861, 1938.
 Beveridge (William H.), Prices and Wages in England from the 12th to the 19th Century, 1939.
 Posthumus (Nicolaas), Nederlandsche Prijsgeschiedenis, 1943–1964.
 Hamilton (Earl J.), War and Prices in Spain (1651–1800), 1947.

References
 Arthur H. Cole, Ruth Crandall, "The International Scientific Committee on Price History", The Journal of Economic History, 24/3, September 1964, p. 381–388.
 Olivier Dumoulin, "Aux origines de l'histoire des prix", Annales. Économies, sociétés, civilisations, 45/2, 1990, .
 Julien Demade, Produire un fait scientifique. Beveridge et le Comité international d'histoire des prix, Paris, Publications de la Sorbonne, 2018.

Historiography
1930s economic history
History of science
1940s economic history